Equus fraternus is an extinct species of Equus, which was native to North America. Specimens of E. fraternus have been found in Florida, Louisiana and Virginia.

References

Pleistocene horses
Prehistoric mammals of North America
Equus (genus)
Taxa named by Joseph Leidy
Fossil taxa described in 1860
Pleistocene mammals of North America